Umagillidae is a family of flatworms belonging to the order Rhabdocoela.

Genera

Genera:
 Anoplodiera Westblad, 1930
 Anoplodiopsis Westblad, 1953
 Anoplodium Schneider, 1858

References

Platyhelminthes